Marianne Bluger (August 28, 1945 – October 29, 2005) was a Canadian poet. She was a recipient of the Archibald Lampman Award.

Life
Bluger was born in  Ottawa. She graduated with distinction from McGill University where she studied pre-medical subjects and philosophy as well as taking poetry courses with Louis Dudek.

She later dropped out of medical school to marry a Zen Master Samu of Toronto.  They had two children: Michael "Maji" Kim (b. 1969), and Micheline "Agi" Mallory (b. 1970). She married Larry Neily, in 1991.

She was executive secretary – treasurer of the Canadian Writers' Foundation, from 1975 to 2000.
She co-founded Christians Against Apartheid, and the Tabitha Foundation.

Awards
Canada Council
1993 Lampman-Scott Award

Works

Anthologies

Reviews
Marianne Bluger's seventh book, Scissor, Paper, Woman, invests in images so precise they resound far beyond the pages that contain them.

References

External links
"Author's website"
"Marianne Bluger", Canadian Poetry, University of Toronto

1945 births
2005 deaths
20th-century Canadian poets
21st-century Canadian poets
Canadian women poets
McGill University alumni
20th-century Canadian women writers
21st-century Canadian women writers